Justin Yak was a Southern Sudan minister for cabinet affairs who died in a plane crash that killed 21 other people 375 km west of Juba, Sudan on 2 May 2008. Bad weather is believed to have been the cause of the plane crash.

References

Year of birth missing
2008 deaths
Victims of aviation accidents or incidents in Sudan
South Sudanese politicians